The 1976 San Diego Padres season was the 8th season in franchise history.

Offseason
 February 26, 1976: Randy Elliott was released by the Padres.

Regular season

Season standings

Record vs. opponents

Opening Day starters
Bob Davis
Willie Davis
Tito Fuentes
Johnny Grubb
Mike Ivie
Randy Jones
Doug Rader
Héctor Torres
Dave Winfield

Notable transactions
 April 5, 1976: Rudy Meoli was traded by the Padres to the Cincinnati Reds for Merv Rettenmund.
 April 29, 1976: Tom Dettore was signed as a free agent by the Padres.
 May 19, 1976: Bill Greif was traded by the Padres to the St. Louis Cardinals for Luis Meléndez.
 May 29, 1976: Diego Seguí was signed as a free agent by the Padres.
 June 8, 1976: 1976 Major League Baseball draft
Bob Owchinko was drafted by the Padres in the 1st round (5th pick).
Craig Stimac was drafted by the Padres in the 9th round.
Mark Lee was drafted by the Padres in the 13th round.
Broderick Perkins was drafted by the Padres in the 15th round.
 July 10, 1976: Gene Locklear was traded by the Padres to the New York Yankees for a player to be named later. The Yankees completed the deal by sending Rick Sawyer to the Padres on July 31.
 August 30, 1976: Willie McCovey was purchased from the Padres by the Oakland Athletics.

Roster

Player stats

Batting

Starters by position
Note: Pos = Position; G = Games played; AB = At bats; H = Hits; Avg. = Batting average; HR = Home runs; RBI = Runs batted in

Other batters
Note: G = Games played; AB = At bats; H = Hits; Avg. = Batting average; HR = Home runs; RBI = Runs batted in

Pitching

Starting pitchers
Note: G = Games pitched; IP = Innings pitched; W = Wins; L = Losses; ERA = Earned run average; SO = Strikeouts

Other pitchers
Note: G = Games pitched; IP = Innings pitched; W = Wins; L = Losses; ERA = Earned run average; SO = Strikeouts

Relief pitchers
Note: G = Games pitched; W = Wins; L = Losses; SV = Saves; ERA = Earned run average; SO = Strikeouts

Award winners
 Randy Jones, National League Cy Young Award
 Butch Metzger, Rookie of the Year
1976 Major League Baseball All-Star Game

Farm system

LEAGUE CHAMPIONS: Hawaii, Amarillo, Reno, Walla WallaReno affiliation shared with Minnesota Twins

References

External links
 1976 San Diego Padres at Baseball Reference
 1976 San Diego Padres at Baseball Almanac

San Diego Padres seasons
San Diego Padres season
San Diego Padres